Mohsin Raza (محسن رضا) is a Pakistani television music director.

Career 
Mohsin Raza was born in Lahore, Pakistan in 1956. He went to Government College University, Lahore, Pakistan for higher education. He started his career as a music composer in 1971 at age 15. Mohsin Raza learned music from Ustad Nazar Hussain and the pianist Master Saqib of Pakistani television at Lahore. He then worked with EMI (Pakistan) from 1973 to 1995 and with the BBC for two years (1984–1985). He has composed music for and conducted more than 500 TV programmes for Pakistani television (PTV) and Radio Pakistan.

Notable Work

Ghazals 
 Niyat-e-shauq bhar na jaye kahin penned by Nasir Kazmi sung by Noor Jehan
 Main tere sang kaise chaloon sajna''' penned by Farhan Salim sung by Noor Jehan
 Shab-e-firaq ki yaro koi sahar bhi ha sung by Abida Parveen
 Dil-e-murter ko samjhaya bohat hai sung by Farida Khanum
 Ghuncha-e-shauq laga hai khilne performed by Mehdi Hassan

 Patriotic Songs 
 Roshan meri ankhon main wafa kay jo diyae hain sung by Noor Jehan
 Mera sohna Pakistan jiye performed by Bilqees Khanum 
 Kabhi Aei haqeeqat muntazir'' penned by Allama Iqbal and sung by Mehnaz Begum.

Awards 
 1990: Received Trophy Award at National Horse and Cattle Show by the Chief Miniter of Punjab, Pakistan.
 1992: Received Trophy Award at National Horse and Cattle Show by the President of Islamic Republic of Pakistan.
 1992: Received Trophy Award at National Games by the President of Islamic Republic of Pakistan.
 1995: Received Trophy Award at National Horse and Cattle Show by the President of Islamic Republic of Pakistan.
 1998: Received Trophy Award at 9th PTV Awards by the General Manager of Pakistan Television, Lahore.
 2006: Received Tamgha-e-Imtiaz (Medal of Excellence) Award by Pervez Musharraf (President of Pakistan)
 2015: Received Trophy Award at National Horse and Cattle Show
 2017: Received Sitara-i-Imtiaz (Star of Excellence) Award by Mamnoon Hussain (President of Pakistan)

References 

Living people
1956 births
Government College University, Lahore alumni
Recipients of Tamgha-e-Imtiaz
Pakistani male composers
20th-century Pakistani male musicians
Recipients of Sitara-i-Imtiaz
EMI Records artists
BBC people
PTV Award winners
Pakistani television people